Lower South Waziristan District  is district located in Dera Ismail Khan Division, Khyber Pakhtunkhwa, Pakistan. The Lower South Waziristan District was created in April 2022 by bifurcation of the South Waziristan District.Wana as its capital. 

Total Population of the district was 307,815 according to the Census of 2017.

Administration 
The district is divided into the following tehsils:
 
Wana 
Shakai 
Toi Khullah 
Birmil

See also
 Upper South Waziristan District

References

South Waziristan District
Districts of Khyber Pakhtunkhwa

2022 establishments in Pakistan